Calosoma obsoletum is a species of ground beetle in the subfamily of Carabinae. It was described by Say in 1823.

References

obsoletum
Beetles described in 1823